Around the World with The Chipmunks is the third album by Alvin and the Chipmunks with David Seville. Released on January 1, 1960, by Liberty Records.  it was the last album to be originally issued with realistic-looking chipmunks on the cover, then reissued the following year with a new cover utilizing the character redesign for The Alvin Show.

Track listing

References

1960 albums
Alvin and the Chipmunks albums
Liberty Records albums
Albums produced by Ross Bagdasarian
Concept albums